Nimbochromis venustus, commonly called venustus hap or giraffe hap, is a Haplochromine cichlid endemid to Lake Malawi in Africa. It prefers the deeper regions of the lake where it hunts smaller juvenile cichlids with a specialised hunting technique. After spotting prey, it will partially submerge itself into the sand and lie motionless until the chosen fish comes within reach. it will then dart out of the sand and strike. It is related to Nimbochromis livingstonii.  In the wild it is known to grow to  TL though usually not exceeding a length of  TL.

It is a popular freshwater aquarium fish. The fish are generally yellow with a pattern of darker, melanic blotches. Males will have a blue head and other blue colouring when they reach sexual maturity.

See also

List of freshwater aquarium fish species

References

venustus
Fish described in 1908